Plantasia is a large public hothouse, located in the Parc Tawe retail park, Swansea, Wales that opened in 1990.

Information

Plantasia exhibits a wide range of tropical plants, insects, reptiles, amphibians, mammals and fish. There is a cafeteria and education room.

The glasshouse contains two climate zones: Tropical with a rainforest, and Arid.  The collection includes around 5,000 plants, some of which are endangered in their natural habitat. Plant types include palms, bananas, giant bamboo, various fruiting plants including Lime and many epiphytes including bromeliads, orchids and aroids, there is also a small collection of cacti and succulents in the arid zone.

Along with the plants, there is supporting wildlife including meerkats, crested geckos, tarantulas, red-bellied piranha, koi carp, green-winged macaw, white-cheeked turaco, bearded dragons and a Burmese python. Additionally, Plantasia houses common marmosets, Asian leopard cats, Spectacled caimans and critically endangered Kleinmann's tortoise.

In 2019 Plantasia added many new features to its exhibits. These included a new cafeteria and gift shop. Within the glasshouse new additions included a waterfall lookout, rainforest hut, living bridge and interactive educational exhibits.

Filming location 
Plantasia was used as a filming location for the Doctor Who episodes "The Doctor's Daughter" (on 21 December 2007) and "Cold Blood" (on 13 November 2009).

References

External links 

Greenhouses in the United Kingdom
Gardens in Wales
Tourist attractions in Swansea
Zoos in Wales
Insectariums